A list of native plants found in the Atlantic Forest Biome of southeastern and southern Brazil. Additions occur as botanical discoveries and reclassifications are presented. They are grouped under their botanical Families.

Acanthaceae
 Mendoncia velloziana Mart.
 Mendoncia puberula Mart.
 Aphelandra squarrosa Nees
 Aphelandra stephanophysa Nees
 Aphelandra rigida Glaz. et Mildbr.
 Justicia polita (Nees) Profice
 Justicia clausseniana (Nees) Profice
 Justicia nervata (Lindau) Profice

Amaranthaceae
 Pfaffia pulverulenta (Mart.) Kuntze

Amaryllidaceae
 Hippeastrum calyptratum Herb.

Anacardiaceae
 Astronium fraxinifolium Schott
 Astronium graveolens Jacq.
 Tapirira guianensis Aubl.

Annonaceae
 Annona cacans Warm.
 Duguetia salicifolia R.E.Fr.
 Guatteria australis A.St.-Hil.
 Guatteria dusenii R.E.Fr.
 Guetteria nigrescens Mart.
 Rollinia laurifolia Schltdl.
 Rollinia sylvatica (A.St.-Hil.) Mart.
 Rollinia xylopiifolia (A.St.-Hil.) R.E.Fr.
 Xylopia brasiliensis Spreng.

Apocynaceae
 Aspidosperma cylindrocarpon Müll.Arg.
 Aspidosperma melanocalyx Müll.Arg.
 Aspidosperma parvifolium A.DC.
 Forsteronia refracta Müll.Arg.
 Mandevilla funiformis (Vell.) K.Schum.
 Mandevilla pendula  (Ule) Woodson
 Odontadenia lutea (Vell.) Markgr.
 Peschiera australis (Müll.Arg.) Miers

Aquifoliaceae
 Ilex breviscupis Reissek
 Ilex integerrima Reissek
 Ilex microdonta Reissek
 Ilex paraguariensis A.St.-Hil.
 Ilex taubertiana Loes.
 Ilex theezans Mart.
 Ilex pubiflora Reissek

Araceae
 Anthurium galeottii K.Koch.
 Anthurium harrisii G.Don
 Anthurium longifolium G.Don
 Anthurium lhotzkyanum Schott
 Anthurium scandens (Aubl.) Engl. subsp. scandens
 Anthurium solitarium Schott
 Anthurium theresiopolitanum Engl.
 Asterostigma luschnatianum Schott
 Philodendron appendiculatum Nadruz et Mayo
 Philodendron altomacaense Nadruz et Mayo
 Philodendron edmundoi G.M.Barroso
 Philodendron eximium Schott
 Philodendron fragile Nadruz et Mayo
 Philodendron hatschbachii Nadruz et Mayo
 Philodendron roseopetiolatum Nadruz et Mayo
 Philodendron ochrostemon Schott
 Philodendron ornatum Schott
 Philodendron propinquum Schott
 Xanthosoma sagittifolium (L.) Schott

Araliaceae
 Didymopanax acuminatus Marchal
 Didymopanax anomalum Taub.
 Oreopanax capitatus (Jacq.) Decne. et Planch.

Araucariaceae
 Araucaria angustifolia (Bertol.) Kuntze

Arecaceae
 Astrocaryum aculeatissimum (Schott) Burret
 Attalea dubia (Mart.) Burret
 Euterpe edulis Mart.
 Geonoma pohliana Mart.
 Geonoma wittigiana Glaz. ex Drude
 Lytocaryum hoehnei (Burret) Toledo
 Lytocaryum insigne (Drude) Toledo

Asclepiadaceae
 Ditassa mucronata Mart.
 Gonioanthela hilariana (E.Fourn.) Malme
 Jobinia lindbergii E.Fourn.
 Jobinia hatschbachii Fontella et  E.A.Schwarz
 Jobinia paranaensis Fontella et C.Valente
 Oxypetalum insigne var. glaziovii (E.Fourn.) Fontella et E. A.Schwarz
 Oxypetalum lutescens E.Fourn.
 Oxypetalum pachuglossum Decne.
 Macroditassa lagoensis (E.Fourn.) Malme
 Macroditassa laxa (Malme) Fontella et de Lamare
 Matelea glaziovii (E.Fourn.) Morillo

Asteraceae
 Baccharis brachylaenoides DC. var. brachylaenoides
 Baccharis intermixta Gardner
 Baccharis microdonta DC.
 Baccharis semiserrata DC. var. semiserrata
 Baccharis trimera (Less.) DC.
 Dasyphyllum brasiliense (Spreng.) Cabrera
 Dasyphyllum spinescens (Less.) Cabrera
 Dasyphyllum tomentosum var. multiflorum (Baker) Cabrera
 Eupatorium adamantium Gardner
 Eupatorium pyrifolium DC.
 Eupatorium rufescens P.W.Lund. ex DC.
 Eupatorium vauthierianum DC.
 Gochnatia rotundifolia Less.
 Hatschbachiella polyclada (Dusén ex Malme) R.M.King & H.Rob.
 Mikania acuminata DC.
 Mikania aff. myriantha DC.
 Mikania argyreiae DC.
 Mikania buddleiaefolia DC.
 Mikania cabrerae G.M.Barroso
 Mikania chlorolepis Baker
 Mikania conferta Gardner
 Mikania glomerata Spreng.
 Mikania hirsutissima DC.
 Mikania lanuginosa DC.
 Mikania lindbergii Baker var. lindbergii
 Mikania lindbergii var. collina Baker
 Mikania microdonta DC.
 Mikania rufescens Sch. Bip. ex Baker
 Mikania trinervis Hook. et Arn.
 Mikania vitifolia DC.
 Mutisia speciosa Aiton ex. Hook.
 Piptocarpha macropoda (DC.) Baker
 Piptocarpha oblonga (Gardner) Baker
 Piptocarpha quadrangularis (Vell.) Baker
 Piptocarpha reitziana Cabrera
 Senecio brasiliensis (Spreng.) Less.
 Senecio desiderabilis Vell.
 Senecio glaziovii Baker
 Senecio organensis Casar.
 Symphyopappus itatiayensis R.M.King et H.Rob.
 Vanillosmopsis erythropappa (DC.) Sch.Bip.
 Vernonia aff. puberula Less.
 Vernonia diffusa Less.
 Vernonia discolor (Spreng.) Less.
 Vernonia macahensis Glaz. ex G.M.Barroso
 Vernonia macrophylla Less.
 Vernonia petiolaris DC.
 Vernonia puberula Less.
 Vernonia stellata (Spreng.) S.F.Blake
 Wunderlichia insignis Baill.

Balanophoraceae
 Langsdorffia hipogaea Mart.
 Scybalium glaziovii Eichler

Basellaceae
 Boussingaultia tucumanensis var. brasiliensis Hauman

Begoniaceae
 Begonia angularis Raddi var. angularis
 Begonia arborescens Raddi
 Begonia coccinea Ruiz ex Klotzsch
 Begonia collaris Brade
 Begonia cucullata Willd. var. cucullata
 Begonia dentatiloba A.DC.
 Begonia digitata Raddi
 Begonia fischeri Schrank
 Begonia fruticosa A.DC.
 Begonia isoptera Dryand.
 Begonia herbacea Vell.
 Begonia hispida Schott ex A.DC. var. hispida
 Begonia hugelii Hort.Berol. ex A.DC.
 Begonia integerrima Spreng. var. integerrima
 Begonia lobata Schott
 Begonia semidigitata Brade
 Begonia paleata A.DC.
 Begonia pulchella Raddi
 Begonia solananthera A.DC.
 Begonia valdensium A.DC. var. valdensium

Bignoniaceae
 Anemopaegma chamberlaynii (Sims) Bureau & K.Schum.
 Callichlamys latifolia (Rich.) K. Schum.
 Fridericia speciosa Mart.
 Haplolophium bracteatum Cham.
 Lundia corymbifera (Vahl) Sandwith
 Schlegelia parviflora (Oerst.) Monach.
 Stizophyllum perforatum (Cham.) Miers
 Tabebuia chrysotricha (Mart. ex A.DC.) Standl.
 Tabebuia heptaphylla (Vell.) Toledo
 Urbanolophium glaziovii (Bureau & K.Schum.) Melch.

Bombacaceae
 Bombacopsis glabra (Pasq.) A.Robyns
 Chorisia speciosa A.St.-Hil. – Floss silk tree
 Eriotheca candolleana (K.Schum.) A.Robyns
 Spirotheca rivieri (Decne.) Ulbrich

Boraginaceae
 Cordia ecalyculata Vell.
 Cordia ochnacea DC.
 Cordia sellowiana Cham.
 Cordia trichoclada DC.
 Tournefortia breviflora DC.

Bromeliaceae
 Aechmea blanchetiana (Baker) L.B.Sm.
 Aechmea bromeliifolia (Rudge) Baker
 Aechmea caesia E.Morren ex Baker
 Aechmea pineliana (Brongn.ex Planch.) Baker var. pineliana
 Ananas ananassoides (Baker) L.B.Sm.
 Billbergia amoena var. rubra M.B.Foster
 Billbergia pyramidalis var. concolor L.B.Sm.
 Billbergia pyramidalis (Sims) var. pyramidalis Lindl.
 Billbergia sanderiana E.Morren
 Canistrum lindenii (Regel) Mez
 Neoregelia carolinae (Beer) L.B.Sm.
 Neoregelia bragarum (E.Pereira & L.B.Sm.) Leme
 Neoregelia farinosa (Ule) L.B.Sm.
 Neoregelia lymaniana R.Braga & Sucre
 Nidularium innocentii Lem. var. innocentii
 Nidularium microps E.Morren ex Mez var. microps
 Nidularium procerum Lindm.
 Nidularium scheremetiewii Regel
 Pitcairnia carinata Mez
 Pitcairnia flammea Lindl. var. flammea
 Quesnelia lateralis Wawra
 Quesnelia liboniana (De Jonghe) Mez
 Tillandsia aeris-incola (Mez) Mez
 Tillandsia geminiflora Brongn. var. geminiflora
 Tillandsia spiculosa Griseb. var. spiculiosa
 Tillandsia stricta Sol. ex Sims. var. stricta
 Tillandsia tenuifolia L. var. tenuifolia
 Vriesea bituminosa Wawra var. bituminosa
 Vriesea carinata Wawra
 Vriesea haematina L.B.Sm.
 Vriesea heterostachys (Baker) L.B.Sm.
 Vriesea hieroglyphica (Carrière) E.Morren var. hieroglyphica
 Vriesea hydrophora Ule
 Vriesea inflata (Wawra) Wawra
 Vriesea longicaulis (Baker) Mez
 Vriesea longiscapa Ule
 Vriesea paraibica Wawra
 Vriesea sparsiflora L.B.Sm.
 Vriesea vagans (L.B.Sm.) L.B.Sm.
 Wittrockia cyathiformis (Vell.) Leme
 Wittrockia flavipetala (Wand.) Leme & H.Luther
 Wittrockia gigantea (Baker) Leme
 Wittrockia superba Lindm.
 Wittrockia tenuisepala (Leme) Leme

Cactaceae
 Hatiora salicornioides (Haw.) Britton & Rose
 Lepismium houlletianum (Lem.) Barthlott
 Rhipsalis capilliformes F.A.C.Weber
 Rhipsalis clavata F.A.C.Weber
 Rhipsalis elliptica G.Lindb. ex K.Schum.
 Rhipsalis floccosa Salm-Dyck ex Pfeiff.
 Rhipsalis houlletiana Lem.
 Rhipsalis trigona Pfeiff.
 Schlumbergera truncata (Haw.) Moran

Campanulaceae
 Centropogon tortilis E.Wimm.
 Siphocampylus longepedunculatus Pohl

Cannaceae
 Canna coccinea Mill.
 Canna paniculata  Ruiz & Pav.

Caprifoliaceae
 Lonicera japonica Thunb. ex Murray – Japanese Honeysuckle

Celastraceae
 Celastrus racemosus Turcz.
 Maytenus brasiliensis Mart.
 Maytenus communis Reiss.

Chloranthaceae
 Hedyosmum brasiliense Miq.

Chrysobalanaceae
 Couepia venosa Prance
 Licania kunthiana Hook.f.

Clethraceae
 Clethra scabra var. laevigata (Meisn.) Sleumer
 Cletha scabra Pers. var. scabra

Clusiaceae
 Clusia criuva Cambess.
 Clusia fragrans Gardner
 Clusia lanceolata Cambess.
 Clusia marizii Gomes da Silva & Weinberg
 Clusia organensis Planch. & Triana
 Clusia studartiana C.M.Vieira & Gomes da Silva
 Kielmeyera insignis N.Saddi
 Rheedia gardneriana Planch. & Triana
 Tovomita glazioviana Engl.
 Tovomitopsis saldanhae Engl.

Combretaceae
 Terminalia januarensis DC.

Commelinaceae
 Dichorisandra thyrsiflora J.C.Mikan
 Tradescantia sp.

Convolvulaceae
 Ipomoea demerariana Choisy (=Ipomoea phyllomega (Vell.) House)

Cornaceae
 Griselina ruscifolia (Clos) Taub.

Cucurbitaceae
 Anisosperma passiflora (Vell.) Silva Manso
 Apodanthera argentea  Cogn.
 Cayaponia cf. tayuya (Vell.) Cogn.
 Melothria cucumis Vell. var. cucumis
 Melothrianthus smilacifolius (Cogn.) Mart. Crov.

Cunoniaceae
 Lamanonia ternata Vell.
 Weinmannia paullinifolia Pohl ex  Ser.

Cyperaceae
 Pleurostachys densefoliata H.Pfeiff.
 Pleurostachys millegrana (Nees) Steud.
 Rhynchospora exaltata Kunth
 Scleria panicoides Kunth

Dichapetalaceae
 Stephanopodium  organense (Rizzini) Prance

Dioscoreaceae
 Dioscorea subhastata Vell.
 Hyperocarpa filiformes (Griseb.) G.M.Barroso, E.F.Guim. & Sucre

Elaeocarpaceae
 Sloanea monosperma Vell.

Ericaceae
 Gaultheria eriophylla (Pers.) Sleumer ex B.L.Burtt
 Gaylussacia aff. fasciculata Gardner
 Gaylussacia brasiliensis (Spreng.) Meisn.

Erythroxylaceae
 Erythroxylum citrifolium A.St.-Hil.
 Erythroxylum cuspidifolium Mart.

Euphorbiaceae
 Alchornea triplinervia (Spreng.) Müll.Arg.
 Croton floribundus  Spreng.
 Croton organensis Baill.
 Croton salutaris Casar.
 Fragariopsis scandens A.St.-Hil.
 Hieronyma alchorneoides Allemão
 Pera obovata (Klotzsch) Baill.
 Phyllanthus glaziovii Müll.Arg.
 Sapium glandulatum Pax
 Tetrorchidium parvulum Müll.Arg.

Fabaceae: Caesalpinioideae
 Bauhinia microstachya (Raddi) J.F.Macbr.
 Copaifera trapezifolia Hayne
 Sclerolobium beaureipairei Harms
 Sclerolobium friburgense Harms
 Sclerolobium rugosum Mart. ex Benth.
 Senna macranthera (DC. ex Collad.) H.S.Irwin & Barneby var. macranthera
 Senna multijuga var. lindleyana (Gardner) H.S.Irwin & Barneby
 Tachigali paratyensis (Vell.) H.C. Lima (= Tachigali multijuga Benth.).

Fabaceae: Faboideae
 Andira fraxinifolia Benth.
 Camptosema spectabile (Tul.) Burkart
 Crotalaria vitellina var. laeta (Mart. ex Benth.) Windler & S. Skinner
 Dalbergia foliolosa Benth.
 Dalbergia frutescens (Vell.) Britton
 Dalbergia glaziovii Harms
 Dalbergia lateriflora Benth.
 Dioclea schottii Benth.
 Erythrina falcata Benth.
 Lonchocarpus glaziovii Taub.
 Machaerium cantarellianum Hoehne
 Machaerium gracile Benth.
 Machaerium nyctitans (Vell.) Benth.
 Machaerium oblongifolium Vogel
 Machaerium reticulatum (Poir.) Pers.
 Machaerium triste Vogel
 Myrocarpus frondosus Allemão
 Ormosia fastigiata Tul.
 Ormosia friburgensis Glaz.
 Pterocarpus rohrii Vahl
 Swartzia myrtifolia var. elegans (Schott) R. S. Cowan
 Zollernia glaziovii Yakovlev
 Zollernia ilicifolia (Brongn.) Vogel

Fabaceae: Mimosoideae
 Abarema langsdorfii (Benth.) Barneby & Grimes
 Acacia lacerans Benth.
 Acacia martiusiana (Steud.) Burkart
 Calliandra tweediei Benth.
 Inga barbata Benth.
 Inga cylindrica (Vell.) Mart.
 Inga dulcis (Vell.) Mart.
 Inga lancifolia Benth.
 Inga lenticellata Benth.
 Inga lentiscifolia Benth.
 Inga leptantha Benth.
 Inga marginata Willd. = Inga semialata (Vell.) Mart.
 Inga mendoncaei Harms = Inga organensis Pittier
 Inga platyptera Benth.
 Inga sessilis (Vell.) Mart.
 Mimosa extensa Benth.
 Piptadenia gonoacantha (Mart.) J. F. Macbr.
 Piptadenia micracantha Benth.

Gentianaceae
 Macrocarpaea glaziovii Gilg

Gesneriaceae
 Besleria fasciculata Wawra
 Besleria macahensis Brade
 Besleria melancholica (Vell.) C. V. Morton
 Codonanthe cordifolia Chautems
 Codonanthe gracilis (Mart.) Hanst.
 Nematanthus crassifolius subsp. chloronema (Mart.) Chautems
 Nematanthus hirtellus (Schott) Wiehler
 Nematanthus lanceolatus (Poir.) Chautems
 Nematanthus serpens (Vell.) Chautems
 Sinningia cooperi (Paxt.) Wiehler
 Sinningia incarnata (Aubl.) D. L. Denham
 Vanhouttea fruticulosa (Hoehne) Chautems

Hippocrateaceae
 Cheiloclinium neglectum A.C.Sm.
 Hippocratea volubilis L.
 Salacia amygdalina Peyr.
 Tontelea leptophylla A.C.Sm.

Humiriaceae
 Humiriastrum glaziovii (Urb.) Cuatrec. var. glaziovii
 Humiriastrum glaziovii var. angustifolium Cuatrec.
 Vantanea compacta (Schnizl.) Cuatrec. subsp. compacta var. compacta
 Vantanea compactasubsp. compacta var. grandiflora (Urb.) Cuatrec.

Icacinaceae
 Citronella paniculata (Mart.) R.A.Howard

Labiatae
 Salvia rivularis Gardner
 Scutellaria uliginosa A.St.-Hil. ex Benth.

Lacistemataceae
 Lacistema pubescens Mart.

Lauraceae
 Aniba firmula (Nees et Mart.) Mez
 Beilschmiedia fluminensis Kosterm.
 Beilschmiedia rigida (Mez) Kosterm.
 Cinnamomum glaziovii (Mez) Kosterm.
 Cinnamomum riedelianum Kosterm.
 Cryptocarya micrantha Meisn.
 Cryptocarya moschata Nees et Mart. ex Nees
 Endlicheria paniculata (Spreng.) J.F.Macbr.
 Nectandra leucantha Nees
 Nectandra oppositifolia Nees
 Nectandra puberula (Schott) Nees
 Ocotea acypahilla (Nees) Mez
 Ocotea catharinensis Mez
 Ocotea diospyrifolia (Meisn.) Mez
 Ocotea dispersa (Nees) Mez
 Ocotea divaricata (Nees) Mez
 Ocotea domatiata Mez
 Ocotea glaziovii Mez
 Ocotea indecora (Schott) Mez
 Ocotea teleiandra (Meisn.) Mez
 Ocotea notata (Nees) Mez
 Ocotea odorifera (Vell.) Rohwer
 Ocotea porosa (Nees) Barroso
 Ocotea puberula (Rich.) Nees
 Ocotea pulchra Vattimo-Gil
 Ocotea silvestris Vattimo-Gil
 Ocotea spixiana (Nees) Mez
 Ocotea tabacifolia Meisn.) Rohwer
 Ocotea urbaniana Mez
 Ocotea vaccinioides Meisn.
 Persea fulva Koop var. fulva
 Persea pyrifolia Nees & Mart. ex Nees
 Rhodostemonodaphne macrocalyx (Meisn.) Rohwer ex Madriñán

Lecythidaceae
 Cariniana estrellensis (Raddi) Kuntze

Lentibulariaceae
 Utricularia geminiloba Benj.

Lobeliaceae 
 Lobelia thapsoidea Schott

Loganiaceae
 Spigelia macrophylla (Pohl) DC.

Loranthaceae
 Phoradendron crassifolium (Pohl & DC.) Eichler
 Phoradendron warmingii var. rugulosum (Urb.) Rizzini
 Psittacanthus flavo-viridis Eichler
 Psittacanthus pluricotyledonarius Rizzini
 Psittacanthus robustus (Mart.) Mart.
 Struthanthus concinnus Mart.
 Struthanthus marginatus (Desr.) Blume
 Struthanthus salicifolius (Mart.) Mart.
 Struthanthus syringaefolius (Mart.) Mart.

Magnoliaceae
 Talauma ovata A.St.-Hil.

Malpighiaceae
 Banisteriopsis membranifolia (A. Juss.) B. Gates
 Byrsonima laevigata (Poir.) DC.
 Byrsonima laxiflora Griseb.
 Byrsonima myricifolia Griseb.
 Heteropteris anomala A. Juss. var. anomala
 Heteropteris leschenaultiana A. Juss.
 Heteropteris nitida (Lam.) DC.
 Heteropteris sericea (Cav.) A. Juss. var. sericea
 Hiraea gaudichaudiana (A. Juss.) A. Jsss.
 Stigmaphyllon gayanum A. Juss
 Tetrapterys crebiflora A. Juss.
 Tetrapterys lalandiana A. Juss.
 Tetrapterys lucida A. Juss.

Malvaceae
 Abutilon rufirnerve A.St.-Hil. var. rufirnerve

Marantaceae
 Stromanthe sanguinea Sond.

Marcgraviaceae
 Marcgravia polyantha Delpino
 Norantea cuneifolia (Gardner) Delpino

Melastomataceae
 Behuria glazioviana Cogn.
 Behuria mouraei Cogn.
 Bertolonia grazielae Baumgratz
 Bertolonia sanguinea var. santos-limae (Brade) Baumgratz
 Bisglaziovia behurioides Cogn.
 Clidemia octona (Bonpl.) L. Wms.
 Henriettella glabra (Vell.) Cogn.
 Huberia glazioviana Cogn.
 Huberia minor Cogn.
 Huberia parvifolia Cogn.
 Huberia triplinervis Cogn.
 Leandra acutiflora (Naudin) Cogn.
 Leandra amplexicaulis DC.
 Leandra aspera Cogn.
 Leandra atroviridis Cogn.
 Leandra aurea (Cham.) Cogn.
 Leandra breviflora Cogn.
 Leandra carassanae (DC.) Cogn.
 Leandra confusa Cogn.
 Leandra dasytricha (A.Gray) Cogn.
 Leandra eriocalyx Cogn.
 Leandra fallax (Cham.) Cogn.
 Leandra foveolata (DC.) Cogn.
 Leandra fragilis Cogn.
 Leandra gracilis var. glazioviana Cogn.
 Leandra hirta Raddi
 Leandra hirtella Cogn.
 Leandra laevigata (Triana) Cogn.
 Leandra laxa Cogn.
 Leandra magdalenensis Brade
 Leandra melastomoides Raddi
 Leandra mollis Cogn.
 Leandra multiplinervis (Naudin) Cogn.
 Leandra multisetosa Cogn.
 Leandra neurotricha Cogn.
 Leandra nianga Cogn.
 Leandra nutans Cogn.
 Leandra purpurascens Cogn.
 Leandra quinquedentata (DC.) Cogn.
 Leandra schwackei Cogn.
 Leandra sphaerocarpa Cogn.
 Leandra tetragona Cogn.
 Leandra trauninensis Cogn.
 Leandra xanthocoma (Naudin.) Cogn.
 Leandra xanthostachya Cogn.
 Marcetia taxifolia (A.St.-Hil.) DC.
 Meriania claussenii Triana
 Meriania robusta Cogn.
 Miconia altissima Cogn.
 Miconia argyrea Cogn.
 Miconia augustii Cogn.
 Miconia brasiliensis (Spreng.) Triana
 Miconia brunnea DC.
 Miconia budlejoides Triana
 Miconia chartacea Triana
 Miconia cinnamomifolia (DC.) Naudin
 Miconia depauperata Gardner
 Miconia dichroa Cogn.
 Miconia divaricata Gardner
 Miconia doriana Cogn.
 Miconia fasciculata Gardner
 Miconia formosa Cogn.
 Miconia gilva Cogn.
 Miconia glazioviana Cogn.
 Miconia jucunda (DC.) Triana
 Miconia latecrenata (DC.) Naudin
 Miconia longicuspis Cogn.
 Miconia octopetala Cogn.
 Miconia organensis Gardner
 Miconia ovalifolia Cogn.
 Miconia molesta Cogn.
 Miconia paniculata (DC.) Naudin
 Miconia paulensis Naudin
 Miconia penduliflora Cogn.
 Miconia prasina (Sw.) DC.
 Miconia pseudo-eichlerii Cogn.
 Miconia pusilliflora (DC.) Naudin
 Miconia rabenii Cogn.
 Miconia saldanhaei var. grandiflora Cogn.
 Miconia sellowiana Naudin
 Miconia staminea (Desr.) DC.
 Miconia subvernicosa Cogn.
 Miconia theaezans (Bonpl.) Cogn.
 Miconia tristis Spring
 Miconia urophylla DC.
 Miconia willdenowii Klotzsch ex Naudin
 Mouriri arborea Gardner
 Mouriri chamissoana Cogn.
 Mouriri doriana Cogn.
 Ossaea angustifolia (DC.) Triana var. brevifolia Cogn.
 Ossaea brachystachya (DC.) Triana
 Ossaea confertiflora (DC.) Triana
 Pleiochiton micranthum Cogn.
 Pleiochiton parvifolium Cogn.
 Pleiochiton roseum Cogn.
 Pleiochiton setulosum Cogn.
 Pleroma semidecandrum (Schrank & Mart. ex DC.) Triana (syn. Tibouchina semidecandra)
 Tibouchina alba Cogn.
 Tibouchina arborea (Gardner) Cogn.
 Tibouchina benthamiana var. punicea Cogn.
 Tibouchina canescens (D.Don) Cogn.
 Tibouchina estrellensis (Raddi) Cogn.
 Tibouchina fissinervia (DC.) Cogn.
 Tibouchina imperatoris Cogn.
 Tibouchina moricandiana (DC.) Baill.
 Tibouchina nervulosa Cogn.
 Tibouchina ovata Cogn.
 Tibouchina petroniana Cogn.
 Tibouchina saldanhaei Cogn.
 Tibouchina schwackei Cogn.
 Trembleya parviflora (D.Don.) Cogn.

Meliaceae
 Cabralea canjerana (Vell.) Mart. subsp. canjerana
 Cedrela odorata L.
 Guarea macrophylla subsp. tuberculata (Vell.) T.D.Penn.
 Trichilia casaretti C.DC.
 Trichilia emarginata (Turcz.) C.DC.

Menispermaceae
 Abuta selloana Eichler
 Chondodendron platyphyllum (A.St.-Hil.) Miers

Monimiaceae
 Macropeplus ligustrinus var. friburgensis Perkins
 Mollinedia acutissima Perkins
 Mollinedia argyrogyna Perkins
 Mollinedia engleriana Perkins
 Mollinedia fasciculata Perkins
 Mollinedia gilgiana Perkins
 Mollinedia glaziovii Perkins
 Mollinedia longicuspidata Perkins
 Mollinedia lowtheriana Perkins
 Mollinedia marliae Peixoto & V.Pereira
 Mollinedia myriantha Perkins
 Mollinedia oligantha Perkins
 Mollinedia pachysandra Perkins
 Mollinedia salicifolia Perkins
 Mollinedia schottiana (Spreng.) Perkins
 Mollinedia stenoplylla Perkins
 Siparuna chlorantha Perkins

Moraceae
 Cecropia cf.lyratiloba Miq.
 Cecropia glaziovii Snethl.
 Cecropia hololeuca Miq.
 Coussapoa microcarpa (Schott) Rizzini
 Ficus luschnathiana (Miq.) Miq.
 Ficus organensis (Miq.) Miq.
 Ficus trigona L.f.
 Sorocea bonplandii (Baill.) W.C.Burger & Alii

Myristicaceae
 Virola gardneri (A.DC.) Warb.

Myrsinaceae
 Cybianthus brasiliensis (Mez) G.Agostini
 Cybianthus glaber A.DC.
 Rapanea acuminata Mez
 Rapanea ferruginea (Ruiz & Pav.) Mez
 Rapanea guianensis Aubl.
 Rapanea lancifolia Mez
 Rapanea schwackeana Mez
 Rapanea umbellata (Mart.) Mez

Myrtaceae
 Calycorectes schottianus O.Berg
 Calyptranthes concinna DC.
 Calyptranthes glazioviana Kiaersk.
 Calyptranthes lucida Mart. ex DC.
 Calyptranthes obovata Kiaersk.
 Campomanesia guaviroba (DC.) Kiaersk.
 Campomanesia laurifolia Gardner
 Eugenia cambucarana Kiaersk.
 Eugenia cuprea (O.Berg) Nied.
 Eugenia curvato-petiolata Kiaersk.
 Eugenia ellipsoidea Kiaersk.
 Eugenia gracillima Kiaersk.
 Eugenia stictosepala Kiaersk.
 Eugenia subavenia O.Berg
 Marlierea Marlierea aff.teuscheriana (O. Berg.) D. Legrand
 Marlierea mar 'tinelii G. M. Barroso & Peixoto
 Marlierea silvatica (Gardner) Kiaersk.
 Marlierea suaveolens Cambess.
 Myrceugenia kleinii D.Legrand & Kausel
 Myrceugenia pilotantha (Kiaersk.) Landrum
 Myrceugenia scutellata D. Legrand
 Myrcia anacardiifolia Gardner
 Myrcia coelosepala Kiaersk.
 Myrcia fallax (Rich.) DC.
 Myrcia fenzliana O.Berg
 Myrcia glabra (O.Berg) D.Legrand
 Myrcia glazioviana Kiaersk.
 Myrcia guajavifolia O.Berg
 Myrcia laruotteana Cambess.
 Myrcia lineata (O. Berg) G. M. Barroso & Peixoto
 Myrcia longipes (O. Berg) Kiaersk.
 Myrcia multiflora (Lam.) DC.
 Myrcia pubipetala Miq.
 Myrcia rhabdoides Kiaersk.
 Myrcia rufula Miq.
 Myrcia spectabilis DC.
 Myrcia tomentosa (Aubl.) DC.
 Myrcia warmingiana Kiaersk.
 Myrciaria floribunda (H. West. ex Willd.) O. Berg –Guavaberry
 Myrciaria tenella (DC.) O. Berg
 Pimenta pseudocaryophyllus var. fulvescens (DC.) Landrum
 Plinia martinellii G. M. Barroso & M. Peron
 Psidium guineense Sw.
 Psidium Psidium robustum O. Berg
 Psidium spathulatum Mattos
 Siphoneugena densiflora O. Berg
 Siphoneugena kiaerskoviana (Burret) Kausel

Nyctaginaceae
 Guapira opposita (Vell.) Reitz

Ochnaceae
 Luxemburgia glazioviana Beauverd
 Ouratea parviflora (DC.) Baill.
 Ouratea vaccinioides (A.St.-Hil.) Engl.

Olacaceae
 Heisteria silvianii Schwacke

Oleaceae
 Linociera micrantha Mart.

Onagraceae
 Fuchsia glazioviana Taub.
 Fuchsia regia subsp. serrae P.E.Berry

Orchidaceae
 Barbosella porschii (Kraenzl.) Schltr.
 Beadlea warmingii (Rchb.f.) Garay
 Chytroglossa marileoniae Rchb.f.
 Dichaea pendula (Aubl.) Cogn.
 Epidendrum addae Pabst
 Epidendrum paranaense Barb.Rodr.
 Epidendrum saxatile Lindl.
 Epidendrum xanthinum Lindl.
 Gomesa recurva Lodd.
 Maxillaria cerifera Barb.Rodr.
 Maxillaria ubatubana var. mantiqueirana Hoehne
 Miltonia cuneata Lindl.
 Oncidium cf.hookeri Rolfe
  Oncidium uniflorum Booth ex Lindl.
 Pabstia jugosa (Lindl.) Garay
 Pabstia triptera (Rolfe) Garay
 Phymatidium aquinoi Schltr.
 Phymatidium delicatulum Lindl.
 Phymatidium falcifolium Lindl.
 Phymatidium tillandsoides Barb.Rodr.
 Pleurothallis aff.hamosa Barb.Rodr.
 Pleurothallis trifida Lindl.
 Prescottia epiphyta Barb.Rodr.
 Rodrigueziopsis microphyta (Barb.Rodr.) Schltr.
 Scaphyglottis modesta (Rchb.f.) Schltr.
 Sophronitis aff.grandiflora Lindl.
 Sophronitis aff.mantiqueirae (Fowlie) Fowlie
 Zygopetalum crinitum Lodd.
 Zygopetalum triste Barb.Rodr.

Passifloraceae
 Passiflora actinia Hook.
 Passiflora alata Dryand.
 Passiflora amethystina J.C.Mikan
 Passiflora deidamioides Harms
 Passiflora odontophylla Harms ex Glaz.
 Passiflora organensis Gardner
 Passiflora rhamnifolia Mast.
 Passiflora speciosa Gardner
 Passiflora vellozii Gardner

Phytolaccaceae
 Phytolacca thyrsiflora Fenzl ex J.A.Schmidt.
 Seguieria langsdorffii Moq.

Piperaceae
 Ottonia diversifolia Kunth
 Peperomia alata Ruiz & Pav.
 Peperomia corcovadensis Gardner
 Peperomia glabella (Sw.) A. Dietr.
 Peperomia lyman-smithii Yunck.
 Peperomia rhombea Ruiz & Pav.
 Peperomia rotundifolia (L.) H. B. & K.
 Peperomia tetraphylla (G. Forst.) Hook. & Arn.
 Piper aequilaterum C. DC.
 Piper caldense C. DC.
 Piper chimonanthifolium Kunth
 Piper gaudichaudianum Kunth
 Piper glabratum Kunth
 Piper hillianum C. DC.
 Piper lhotzkyanum Kunth
 Piper malacophyllum (C. Presl) C. DC.
 Piper permucronatum Yunck.
 Piper pseudopothifolium C. DC.
 Piper richardiifolium Kunth
 Piper tectonifolium Kunth
 Piper translucens Yunck.
 Piper truncatum Vell.

Poaceae
 Chusquea aff. oxylepis (Hack.) Ekman
 Chusquea aff. tenella Nees
 Chusquea anelytroides Rupr. ex Döll
 Chusquea capitata Nees
 Chusquea capituliflora Trin.
 Guadua tagoara (Nees) Kunth
 Merostachys aff. ternata Nees
 Merostachys fischeriana Rupr. ex Döll

Podocarpaceae
 Podocarpus lambertii Klotzsch ex Endl.
 Podocarpus sellowii Klotzsch ex Endl.

Polygalaceae
 Polygala laureola A.St.-Hil. & Moq.
 Polygala oxyphylla DC.
 Securidaca macrocarpa A.W.Benn.

Polygonaceae
 Ruprechtia laxiflora Meisn.

Proteaceae
 Roupala consimilis Mez
 Roupala longepetiolata Pohl
 Roupala rhombifolia Mart. ex  Meisn.
 Roupala warmingii Meisn.

Quiinaceae
 Quiina glaziovii Engl.

Ranunculaceae
 Clematis dioica var. australis Eichler
 Clematis dioica var. brasiliana (DC.) Eichler

Rosaceae
 Prunus brasiliensis Schott ex Spreng.
 Rubus urticaefolius Poir.

Rubiaceae
 Alibertia longiflora K.Schum.
 Amaioua intermedia Mart.
 Bathysa australis (A.St.-Hil.) Benth. & Hook.f.
 Bathysa cuspidata (A.St.-Hil.) Hook.f.
 Bathysa mendocaei K.Schum.
 Chomelia brasiliana
 Chomelia estrellana Müll.Arg.
 Coccocypselum lanceolatum (Ruiz & Pav.) Pers.
 Coccocypselum sessiliflorum Standl.
 Coussarea congestiflora Müll.Arg.
 Coussarea friburgensis M. Gomes
 Coussarea speciosa K.Schum. ex. Glaz.
 Coutarea hexandra (Jacq.) K.Schum.
 Diodia alataNees & Mart.
 Emmeorrhiza umbellata (Spreng.) K.Schum.
 Faramea dichotoma K.Schum. ex M.Gomes
 Faramea multiflora var. salicifolia (C. Presl.) Steyerm.
 Faramea urophylla Müll.Arg.
 Galium hypocarpium subsp. indecorum (Cham. & Schltdl.) Dempster
 Hillia parasitica Jacq.
 Hindsia longiflora (Cham.) Benth.
 Hoffmannia duseniiStandl.
 Ixora brevifolia Benth.
 Manettia beyrichiana K.Schum.
 Manettia congesta (Vell.) K.Schum.
 Manettia fimbriata Cham. & Schltdl.
 Manettia mitis (Vell.) K. Schum.
 Posoqueria acutifolia Mart.
 Posoqueria latifolia (Rudge) Roem. & Schult.
 Psychotria alto-macahensis M.Gomes
 Psychotria appendiculata Müll.Arg.
 Psychotria brachyanthema Standl.
 Psychotria caudata M.Gomes
 Psychotria constricta Müll.Arg.
 Psychotria leiocarpa Cham. & Schltdl.
 Psychotria nemerosa Gardner
 Psychotria nitidula Cham. & Schltdl.
 Psychotria pallens Gardner
 Psychotria pubigera Schltdl.
 Psychotria ruelliifolia (Cham. & Schltdl.) Müll.Arg.
 Psychotria stachyoides Benth.
 Psychotria suterella Müll.Arg.
 Psychotria ulei Standl.
 Psychotria vellosiana Benth.
 Randia armata (Sw.) DC.
 Rudgea corniculata Benth.
 Rudgea gardenoides (Cham.) Müll.Arg.
 Rudgea eugenioides Standl.
 Rudgea insignis Müll.Arg.
 Rudgea jasminoides (Cham.) Müll.Arg.
 Rudgea leiocarpoides Müll.Arg.
 Rudgea nobilis Müll.Arg.
 Rudgea recurva Müll.Arg.
 Rustia gracilis K.Schum.
 Tocoyena sellowiana (Cham. & Schltdl.) K.Schum.

Rutaceae
 Dictyoloma incanescens DC.
 Zanthoxylum rhoifolium Lam. (= Fagara rhoifolia (Lam.) Engl.)

Sabiaceae
 Meliosma brasiliensis Urb.
 Meliosma sellowii Urb.

Salicaceae
 Casearia arborea (Rich.) Urb.
 Casearia decandra Jacq.
 Casearia obliqua Spreng.
 Casearia pauciflora Cambess.
 Casearia sylvestris Sw.
 Xylosma ciliatifolia (Clos) Eichler
 Xylosma prockia (Turcz.) Turcz.

Sapindaceae
 Allophylus edulis (A.St.-Hil.) Radlk.
 Cupania emarginata Cambess.
 Cupania oblongifolia Mart.
 Cupania racemosa (Vell.) Radlk.
 Cupania zanthoxyloides Cambess.
 Matayba guianensis Aubl.
 Paullinia carpopoda Cambess.
 Paullinia meliaefolia Juss.
 Paullinia trigonia Vell.
 Serjania communis Cambess. var. communis
 Serjania elegans Cambess.
 Serjania gracilis Radlk.
 Serjania laruotteana Cambess.
 Serjania lethalis A.St.-Hil.
 Serjania noxia Cambess.
 Serjania reticulata Cambess.
 Thinouia scandens (Cambess.) Triana & Planch.

Sapotaceae
 Chrysophyllum imperiale
 Chrysophyllum viride Martius & Eichler
 Micropholis compta Pierre
 Micropholis crassipedicellata (Mart. & Eichl.) Pierre
 Pouteria guianensis Aubl.
 Pouteria microstrigosa T.D.Penn.
 Pouteria macahensis T.D.Penn.

Scrophulariaceae
 Velloziella dracocephaloides Baill.

Simaroubaceae
 Picramnia glazioviana Engl. subsp. glazioviana
 Simarouba amara Aubl.

Smilacaceae
 Smilax japicanga Griseb.
 Smilax quinquenervia Vell.
 Smilax spicata Vell.
 Smilax staminea Griseb.

Solanaceae
 Acnistus arborescens (L.) Schltdl.
 Athenaea anonacea Sendtn.
 Athenaea picta (Mart.) Sendtn.
 Aureliana brasiliana (Hunz.) Barboza & Hunz.
 Aureliana fasciculata (Vell.) Sendtn. var. fasciculata
 Brunfelsia brasiliensis (Spreng.) L.B.Sm. & Downs var. brasiliensis
 Brunfelsia hydrangaeformis (Pohl) Benth. subsp. hydrangaefomis
 Capsicum campylopodium Sendtn.
 Cestrum lanceolatum Miers var. lanceolatum
 Cestrum aff.sessiliflorum Schott ex Sendtn.
 Cestrum stipulatum Vell.
 Cyphomandra calycina Sendtn.
 Dyssochroma viridiflora (Sims) Miers
 Sessea regnellii Taub.
 Solanum aff.schizandrum Sendtn.
 Solanum argenteum Dunal
 Solanum caeruleum Vell.
 Solanum cinnamomeum Sendtn.
 Solanum decorum Sendtn. var. decorum
 Solanum granuloso-leprosum Dunal
 Solanum inaequale Vell.
 Solanum inodorum Vell.
 Solanum leucodendron Sendtn.
 Solanum megalochiton var. villoso-tomentosum Dunal
 Solanum odoriferum Vell.
 Solanum stipulatum Vell.
 Solanum swartzianum Roem. & Schult. var. swartzianum
 Solanum undulatum Dunal

Symplocaceae
 Symplocos celastrinea Mart. ex Miq.
 Symplocos crenata (Vell.) Mattos
 Symplocos glandulosomarginata Hoehne
 Symplocos nitidiflora Brand.
 Symplocos tertandra Mart. ex Miq.
 Symplocos uniflora (Pohl) ex Benth.

Theaceae
 Laplacea fruticosa (Schrad.) Kobuski

Thymelaeaceae
 Daphnopsis martii Meisn.
 Daphnopsis utilis Warm.

Tiliaceae
 Luehea divaricata Mart.

Umbelliferae
 Hydrocotyle leucocephala Cham. & Schltdl.

Valerianaceae
 Valeriana scandens L.

Verbenaceae
 Aegiphila fluminensis Vell.
 Aegiphila obducta Vell.
 Aegiphila sellowiana Cham.

Violaceae
 Anchietea pyrifolia (Mart.) G.Don var. pyrifolia

Vitaceae
 Cissus pulcherrima Vell.
 Cissus sulcicaulis (Baker) Planch.

Vochysiaceae
 Vochysia dasyantha Warm.
 Vochysia glazioviana Warm.
 Vochysia magnifica Warm.
 Vochysia oppugnata (Vell.) Warm.
 Vochysia rectiflora var. glabrescens Warm.
 Vochysia saldanhana Warm.
 Vochysia schwackeana Warm.
 Vochysia spathulata  Warm.
 Vochysia tucanorum Mart.

Winteraceae
 Drimys brasiliensis Miers

Zingiberaceae
 Hedychium coronarium J.König

See also
 Ecoregions of the Atlantic Forest biome
 Official list of endangered flora of Brazil 
 List of plants of Amazon Rainforest vegetation of Brazil
 List of plants of Caatinga vegetation of Brazil
 List of plants of Cerrado vegetation of Brazil
 List of plants of Pantanal vegetation of Brazil

References

  LIMA, H. C.; MORIM, M. P.; GUEDES-BRUNI, R. R.; SYLVESTRE, L. S.; PESSOA, S. V. A.; SILVA NETO, S.; QUINET, A. (2001) Reserva Ecológica de Macaé de Cima, Nova Friburgo, Rio de Janeiro: Lista de espécies vasculares  (List of vascular plants) — Rio de Janeiro Botanical Garden.
  Restinga.net — Atlantic Coast restingas.

External links

 
 Atlantic Forest
Atlantic Forest
Atlantic Forest
Atlantic Forest
Brazil